The Continental Shelf Act 1964 is an Act of Parliament in New Zealand regulating the use of the continental shelf. It is administered by the Ministry of Foreign Affairs and Trade. Except for two sections the Act it is in force in the Cook Islands, a country in free association with New Zealand. It was amended by the Crown Minerals Amentment Act 2013.

See also
Coastline of New Zealand

References

External links
Text of the Act

Statutes of New Zealand
1964 in the environment
1964 in New Zealand law
Environmental law in New Zealand